The Honourable The King's (or Queen's) Champion is an honorary and hereditary office in the Royal Household of the British sovereign. The champion's original role at the coronation of a British monarch was to challenge anyone who contested the new monarch's entitlement to the throne to trial by combat. Although this function was last enacted at the coronation of George IV in 1821, the office continues to descend through the Dymoke family.

The feudal holder of the Manor of Scrivelsby in Lincolnshire, England, has, since the Norman Conquest in 1066, held the manor from the Crown by grand serjeanty of being the King's or Queen's Champion. Such person is also the Standard Bearer of England. The current King's Champion is a member of the Dymoke family, which has included many Champions.

The next and 35th Champion will be the 34th Lord of the manor of Scrivelsby, Thornton and Dalderby and patron of the living of Scrivelsby-cum-Dalderby, Francis John Fane Marmion Dymoke, DL (b. 19 January 1955), a chartered accountant. He will gain the title of King's Champion at the coronation of Charles III. He served as High Sheriff of Lincolnshire in 1999. His eldest son and heir apparent is Henry Francis Marmion Dymoke (born 1984).

History

Origins 
The office of King's Champion was originally granted to Robert Marmion, 1st Baron Marmion, along with the castle and Manor of Tamworth and the Manor of Scrivelsby in the time of William the Conqueror. From then until the nineteenth century the officer's role was to act as champion for the monarch at his or her coronation, in the unlikely event that someone challenged the new monarch's title to the throne. The Champion was required to ride in full armour into Westminster Hall during the coronation banquet, escorted by the Earl Marshal and the Lord High Constable, all in full dress, robes and coronets, and await the challenge to all comers. The king could not fight in single combat against anyone except an equal. This trial by combat remained purely ceremonial and had a central place in the coronation banquet.

By 1377 the senior male line of the Marmions had died out, and in that year the office of King's Champion at the coronation of King Richard II was fulfilled by Sir John Dymoke, who had married Margaret Ludlow, daughter of Sir Thomas Ludlow and Johanna Marmion, daughter of Sir Philip Marmion (d.1291). Margaret was the heiress of the senior branch of the Marmion family, and so held the Manor of Scrivelsby. The claim by Sir Baldwin de Freville, who then held the Manor of Tamworth, was rejected.

In later years, the Garter King of Arms read out the challenge, and the Champion threw down the gauntlet at the entrance to Westminster Hall, then again in the middle of the Hall, and lastly at the foot of the Throne, each time repeating the challenge. Each time the gauntlet was recovered by Garter. The Champion was rewarded with a gilt-covered cup, the monarch having first drunk to the Champion from it.

John II Walshe (d.1546/7) of Little Sodbury, Gloucestershire, was King's Champion at the coronation of Henry VIII in 1509 and was a great favourite of the young king.

Modern era 

The words of the challenge varied over the years, but those used for the coronation of George IV in 1821 were these:

The holder of the post at that time, the Reverend John Dymoke, was a clergyman and so the honour passed to his son, Henry Dymoke, who was only 20 years old and did not possess a suitable horse, so one had to be hired from Astley's Circus.

William IV held no coronation banquet in 1831, so the King's Champion was not called upon to act. At the Coronation of Queen Victoria in 1838, it was decided not to include the traditional ride and challenge of the Champion, and Henry Dymoke was made a baronet in recompense. It has never yet been revived.  At the 1902 coronation of Edward VII, his claim was admitted by the Court of Claims, and he was allowed to be Standard Bearer of England. Lieutenant-Colonel John Lindley Marmion Dymoke, MBE, DL, Royal Lincolnshire Regiment had his claim admitted at the coronation of Queen Elizabeth II in 1953 and acted as Standard-Bearer of the Union Flag.

The Champion's Armour used for the coronations of James I to George IV still exists and is on display in St George's Hall, Windsor Castle.

Office holders

The following is an incomplete list of those who have served as Champions:

References

Bibliography

 

State ritual and ceremonies
Ceremonial officers in the United Kingdom
Coronations of British monarchs